Major General Charles Grant Long (December 14, 1869 – March 5, 1943) was the third Assistant Commandant of the Marine Corps. He was also a recipient of the Marine Corps Brevet Medal and Navy Cross.

Biography
Charles Long was born December 14, 1869, in South Weymouth, Massachusetts. He graduated from the United States Naval Academy in 1891 and received a commission as a second lieutenant on July 1, 1891.

He retired from the Marine Corps in December 1921 after 30 years of service and died March 5, 1943, at South Dartmouth, Massachusetts.

Awards
Long's awards and decorations include:

See also

References

General

 
 
 
 

1869 births
1943 deaths
People from Weymouth, Massachusetts
United States Marine Corps generals
United States Naval Academy alumni
United States Army War College alumni
American military personnel of the Boxer Rebellion
American military personnel of the Spanish–American War
American military personnel of the Philippine–American War
United States Marine Corps personnel of World War I
Recipients of the Navy Cross (United States)
Burials at Arlington National Cemetery
Military personnel from Massachusetts